Le Roy John Schalk (November 9, 1908 – March 11, 1990) was an American baseball player and manager.

Schalk was not related to Chicago White Sox Hall of Fame catcher Ray Schalk, although both were from Illinois. After playing with unaffiliated minor league teams in Ottumwa, Iowa, Fairbury, Nebraska and Oklahoma City (where he hit .344 in 1932), the New York Yankees signed the second baseman, who joined the team in St. Louis on September 17. Starting three games at second (including both ends of a doubleheader on the 18th) against the hapless Browns, Schalk went 3-for-12 with a double. They would be his only games as a Yankee.

The following year, the Yanks assigned him to their top farm club in Newark; after bouncing around with minor-league clubs in Newark, Baltimore and Little Rock for a full decade, it looked like Schalk's big-league days were over.

Then came World War II. After a year away from the game in 1943, his hometown White Sox—desperate for fresh bodies—signed the 35-year-old Schalk as their second baseman. After hitting only .220 that year (but playing solid defensively in 146 games), Schalk returned to the Sox lineup in 1945 and batted .248, leading the majors in sacrifice hits and even drawing some MVP votes. In 1946, when the top MLB stars headed back from the war, Schalk returned to Oklahoma City—this time as player/manager. Schalk was fired the following year but hooked on with the Brooklyn Dodgers' farm club in Newport News, Virginia, where he played and piloted the club in 1948-49. Finally, he took over the El Dorado, Arkansas Oilers in the Class C Cotton States League in 1950. Unfortunately, Schalk hardly found gold in El Dorado: the club finished deep in last place at 38-101. It was Schalk's last year in baseball.

Roy Schalk eventually relocated to Gainesville, Texas, where he died at the age 81 in 1990.

External links

1908 births
1990 deaths
Major League Baseball second basemen
New York Yankees players
Chicago White Sox players
Baseball players from Chicago
Minor league baseball managers
Sportspeople from Chicago
Ottumwa Packers players
Fairbury Jeffersons players
Oklahoma City Indians players
Newark Bears (IL) players
Baltimore Orioles (IL) players
Little Rock Travelers players
Fort Worth Cats players
Newport News Dodgers players
El Dorado Oilers players